is a railway station built in Ureshino, Saga, Japan, by the Kyushu Railway Company (JR Kyushu).

Lines
Ureshino-Onsen Station is served by the Nishi Kyushu Shinkansen.

Platforms
The station consists of 2 side platforms with two tracks total.

History 
Shin-Ōmura Station opened on 23 September 2022 when the Nishi Kyushu Shinkansen began revenue service.

References

External links
 Saga prefecture explanation meeting data 

Railway stations in Saga Prefecture
Railway stations in Japan opened in 2022